Folkston is a city in and the county seat of Charlton County, Georgia, United States. Folkston is in the Jacksonville Metropolitan Area. The population was 2,502 as of the 2010 census, up from 2,178 in 2000, largely due to the extension of the city boundary to include D. Ray James Prison.

History

Folkston was founded on August 19, 1911. The city was named in honor of William Brandon Folks, M.D., a prominent physician and surgeon in his day. In the years 1925 through 1927, many new and commodious residences were built and several modern brick buildings were erected, including the Citizen Bank Block, the Masonic Temple building, a grammar school building, and a courthouse. Shortly after its creation, the village of Folkston was incorporated as a town government and functioned as a town until 1911 when the area was incorporated as a city. For a number of years, Folkston was the self-proclaimed "Marriage Capital of the World"; Floridians who could not endure their state's waiting period before tying the knot would cross the state line to wed.

Geography
Folkston is located near the southern boundary of Georgia at  (30.834437, -82.004829). U.S. Routes 1, 23, and 301 pass through the city as Second Street, leading south  to Jacksonville, Florida. Route 1 and 23 lead northwest  to Waycross, while Route 301 leads north  to Jesup.

Demographics

2020 census

As of the 2020 United States census, there were 4,464 people, 1,082 households, and 667 families residing in the city.

2010 census
As of the 2010 United States Census, there were 2,502 people living in the city. The racial makeup of the city was 50.0% Black, 45.4% White, 0.1% Native American, 1.1% Asian, 0.0% from some other race and 2.3% from two or more races. 1.0% were Hispanic or Latino of any race.

2000 census
As of the census of 2000, there were 2,178 people, 817 households, and 548 families living in the city. The racial makeup of the city was 46.14% White; 51.52% African American; 0.18% Native American. 0.41% Asian; 0.05% Pacific Islander; 0.18% from other races, and 1.52% from two or more races. Hispanic or Latino of any race were 0.87% of the population.

There were 817 households, out of which 31.9% had children under the age of 18 living with them; 41.6% were married couples living together; 21.9% had a female householder with no husband present; and 32.9% were non-families. 29.0% of all households were made up of individuals, and 12.7% had someone living alone who was 65 years of age or older.  The average household size was 2.58 and the average family size was 3.20.

In the city, the population was spread out, with 29.0% under the age of 18; 8.9% from 18 to 24; 26.4% from 25 to 44; 20.5% from 45 to 64; and 15.2% who were 65 years of age or older.  The median age was 36 years. For every 100 females, there were 82.0 males.  For every 100 females age 18 and over, there were 78.3 males.

The median income for a household in the city was $21,840, and the median income for a family was $32,375. Males had a median income of $26,302 versus $19,816 for females. The per capita income for the city was $13,653.  About 26.1% of families and 28.6% of the population were below the poverty line, including 39.8% of those under age 18 and 20.4% of those age 65 or over.

Arts and culture

Folkston Funnel 
With a high percentage of rail traffic headed to Florida passing through Folkston, the rail lines through the city have acquired the nickname "The Folkston Funnel." As many as 35 trains a day pass through Folkston heading into and out of Florida, which some years draws ten times as many railfans as people who live in the city. To provide for a safe (and advantageous) viewing situation, the town has followed the example of another high-density rail town, Rochelle, Illinois, and has built a platform for visitors, along with picnic tables, chairs, barbecue pits, restrooms, grills, and even WiFi. At night, lights shine from the platform onto the double track so if someone wanted to, he or she could watch after sunset. Freight trains from the east and northeast arrive via Savannah, go through the Folkston Funnel, and proceed to terminals such as Jacksonville, Tampa, and Miami. Freight trains from the midwest arrive via Atlanta or Birmingham and proceed into Florida. Freight trains that originate in Florida take the same routes in opposite direction. In addition, Amtrak's Silver Star, Silver Meteor, and Auto Train pass through the Folkston Funnel, although they do not stop there.

At the covered viewing platform, there is an active scanner running and visitors can listen to train engineers as they run the trains through. There is also free WiFi for visitors.

Education

Charlton County School District 
The Charlton County School District holds grades pre-school to grade twelve. It consists of three elementary schools, a high school, and a private school. The district has 114 full-time teachers and over 2,015 students.
Folkston Elementary School - Pre-K to 3rd grade
Bethune Middle School (named after Mary McLeod Bethune) - 4th to 8th grade
St. George Elementary School
Charlton County High School - 9th to 12th grade

Private school 
Christian Academy - Pre-K to 12th grade

Notable people

 Champ Bailey, Pro Football Hall of Fame cornerback of the National Football League
 Boss Bailey, linebacker who played in the National Football League, born in Folkston
Eldridge Milton, former NFL football linebacker for the Chicago Bears and his collegiate years at Clemson University was the first person from Folkston to play in the NFL.
Larry Smith Jr., former NFL career with the Jacksonville Jaguars and Green Bay Packers, played at the Florida State University.
 Canadian cannabis activist Marc Emery was serving a five-year prison sentence at D. Ray James Correctional Institution in Folkston before he was transferred to the Federal Correctional Institution (FCI) in Yazoo City, Mississippi.
 Courtney M. Williams - WNBA Player for the Atlanta Dream

References

External links
 

City of Folkston official website
Folkston, Georgia, at City-Data.com
The Folkston Funnel
Charlton County Herald, local newspaper
Folkston Junction, Florida Times-Union article
Folkston at Georgia.gov
Charlton County Schools

Cities in Georgia (U.S. state)
Cities in Charlton County, Georgia
County seats in Georgia (U.S. state)
Populated places established in 1911
1911 establishments in Georgia (U.S. state)